Saraki is a Nigerian surname of Yoruba origin. Notable people with the surname include:

Bukola Saraki (born 1962), former President of the Senate of Nigeria and Governor of Kwara State
Olusola Saraki (1933–2012), Nigerian politician and senator
Toyin Saraki (born 1964), Nigerian philanthropist
Gbemisola Ruqayyah Saraki (born 1965), Nigerian politician and current Minister of State for Mines and Steel Development

Yoruba-language surnames